John W. English (February 1831 – July 18, 1916) was a justice of the Supreme Court of Appeals of West Virginia from January 1, 1889 to December 31, 1900. At the time of his death, he was the seniormost former living justice of the court.

English was a Democrat. Future justice George Poffenbarger studied law under English.

References

1831 births
1916 deaths
Justices of the Supreme Court of Appeals of West Virginia
West Virginia Democrats